Moksi is a small village in Korpilahti, since 2009 a part of Jyväskylä. It is located in the Pohjois-Korpilahti sub-district along with Tikkala and Sarvenperä-Saukkola.

Geography 
Moksi is located near a lake named Moksinjärvi, connected to Päijänne by the Vuojoki.

The highest point of Korpilahti (and Jyväskylä since 2009) is Uutelanmäki in the southern part of Moksi, at 257,80 m from sea level.

History 
Moksi is named after a local farm, established in 1582. According to Terho Itkonen, the name is of Sámi origin and related to the Inari Sámi word mokseđ meaning "to cross over water". The village name Moksi in Vihti likely has the same origin. As a village, Moksi was first mentioned in 1773 as Moxi. It was a part of Jämsä until 1861 when Korpilahti became an independent municipality. After Korpilahti's consolidation with Jyväskylä in 2009, Moksi became one of its sub-districts. 

The village has also been known as Riihijärvi, which may suggest that this name has been used for the Moksinjärvi as well.

Events 
The special stage of Rally Finland has often been driven in Moksi. In 2021 and 2022, the route was called Sahloinen-Moksi, Sahloinen being a nearby village further west in Koskenpää.

Services 
Moksi does not have a functioning school. The former school building is now used as a meeting hall.

External links 
 moksi.fi – Official website

References 

Jyväskylä
Villages in Finland
Korpilahti